Sesato is a monotypic genus of African comb-footed spiders containing the single species, Sesato setosa. It was first described by Michael I. Saaristo in 2006, and is found on the Seychelles.

See also
 List of Theridiidae species

References

Further reading

Monotypic Araneomorphae genera
Spiders of Africa
Theridiidae